Cornelius Cleopatrick Randolph (born July 2, 1997) is an American professional baseball outfielder who is currently a free agent.

Career
Randolph attended Griffin High School in Griffin, Georgia. During Randolph's senior year, he hit .533 with eight home runs and a 1.631 OPS. He committed to play college baseball for the Clemson Tigers, but after the Philadelphia Phillies selected him with the 10th pick in the first round of the 2015 Major League Baseball draft, he signed with the Phillies, receiving a $3,231,300 signing bonus.

Philadelphia Phillies
Randolph made his professional debut with the Gulf Coast Phillies, batting .302 with one home run and 24 RBIs over 53 games. In 2016, he played with the Lakewood BlueClaws where he hit .274 with two home runs and 27 RBIs over 63 games. Randolph spent 2017 with the Clearwater Threshers, slashing .250/.338/.402 with 13 home runs and 55 RBIs over 122 games, and after the season, played in the Arizona Fall League for the Glendale Desert Dogs. He spent 2018 with the Reading Fightin Phils, batting .241 with five home runs and forty RBIs over 118 games. In 2019, he returned to play for Reading, hitting .247 with ten home runs and 44 RBIs over 102 games. Randolph did not play in a game in 2020 due to the cancellation of the minor league season because of the COVID-19 pandemic. In 2021, Randolph spent the majority of the season with the Triple-A Lehigh Valley IronPigs, also appearing in 5 games for the Phillies' rookie-level affiliate, slashing .235/.323/.386 in with 5 home runs and 20 RBI in 48 games for the team. On November 7, 2021, Randolph elected free agency.

Chicago White Sox
On March 8, 2022, Randolph signed a minor league contract with the Chicago White Sox. Randolph was assigned to the Double-A Birmingham Barons to begin the season. After struggling to a .118/.211/.117 with no home runs and 1 RBI in 11 games for Birmingham, he was released by the White Sox organization on May 3.

Kane County Cougars
On May 10, 2022, Randolph signed with the Kane County Cougars of the American Association of Professional Baseball.

References

External links

1997 births
Living people
Baseball players from Georgia (U.S. state)
Baseball infielders
Lakewood BlueClaws players
Clearwater Threshers players
Reading Fightin Phils players
Glendale Desert Dogs players
Adelaide Giants players
Lehigh Valley IronPigs players
Florida Complex League Phillies players
Birmingham Barons players
African-American baseball players
Kane County Cougars players
American expatriate baseball players in Australia